Azerbaijan is scheduled to compete at the 2017 World Aquatics Championships in Budapest, Hungary from 14 July to 30 July.

Open water swimming

Azerbaijan has entered one open water swimmer

Swimming

Azerbaijan has received a Universality invitation from FINA to send a male swimmer to the World Championships.

References

Nations at the 2017 World Aquatics Championships
Azerbaijan at the World Aquatics Championships
2017 in Azerbaijani sport